John Peers and Michael Venus were the defending champions, but they chose not to participate.

Juan Sebastián Cabal and Robert Farah won the title, defeating Nikola Mektić and Mate Pavić in the final, 7–6(7–0), 7–6(7–4).

Seeds

Draw

Draw

Qualifying

Seeds

Qualifiers
  Lorenzo Sonego /  Andrea Vavassori

Lucky losers
  Marcelo Arévalo /  Matwé Middelkoop

Qualifying draw

References

External Links
 Main draw
 Qualifying draw

2021 ATP Tour
Doubles men